Prodosia mycha is the only species in the monotypic moth genus Prodosia of the family Noctuidae. It is found in Panama. Both the genus and species were first described by Harrison Gray Dyar Jr. in 1914.

References

Acontiinae
Monotypic moth genera
Moths of Central America